Michael Pettigrew (born 16 March 1985) is an Australian rules footballer currently listed with the West Perth Football Club in the West Australian Football League (WAFL). He previously played for the Port Adelaide Football Club in the Australian Football League (AFL). He played his 100th AFL game in Round 13, 2011 against West Coast, and retired at the end of the 2011 season.

References

External links 

Port Adelaide Football Club players
Port Adelaide Football Club players (all competitions)
West Perth Football Club players
1985 births
Living people
West Adelaide Football Club players
Australian rules footballers from Perth, Western Australia
Wanderers Football Club players
Palmerston Football Club players